Rhinorrhea or runny nose
 Post-nasal drip, mucus running down the throat